The Richard-Gebert-Sportanlage was the home of Austrian football club SK Schwadorf until the club merged with VfB Admira Wacker Mödling in 2008.

References

Football venues in Austria